This article lists the confirmed squads for the 1998 Men's Hockey World Cup tournament which was held in Utrecht, Netherlands between 21 May and 1 June 1998.

Pool A

Canada
The following players were named for the Canada team.

Germany
The following players were named for the Germany team.

India
The following players were named for the India team.

Netherlands
The following players were named for the Netherlands team.

New Zealand
The following players were named for the New Zealand team.

South Korea
The following players were named for the South Korea team.

Pool B

Australia
The following players were named for the Australia team.

England
The following players were named for the England team.

Malaysia
The following players were named for the Malaysia team.

Pakistan
The following players were named for the Pakistan team.

Poland
The following players were named for the Poland team.

Spain
The following players were named for the Spain team.

References

Squads
Men's Hockey World Cup squads